Lurøy is a municipality in Nordland county, Norway. It is part of the Helgeland traditional region. The administrative centre of the municipality is the village of Lurøy, located on the island of Lurøya. Other villages in Lurøy include Aldra, Haugland, Konsvikosen, Lovund, Sleneset / Solværøyene, Stokkvågen, and Tonnes.

The municipality is located on the coast just south of the Arctic circle, on the western edge of the Saltfjellet mountain range.

The  municipality is the 275th largest by area out of the 356 municipalities in Norway. Lurøy is the 286th most populous municipality in Norway with a population of 1,869.

General information

Lurøy was established as a municipality on 1 January 1838 (see formannskapsdistrikt law). On 1 January 1872, the far western island district (population: 289) was separated from Lurøy to become the new municipality of Træna. This left Lurøy with 1,554 residents. The borders of Lurøy have not changed since that time.

Name
The municipality (originally the parish) is named after the island of Lurøya since the first Lurøy Church was built there. Historically, the name was spelled Lurø.

Coat of arms
The coat of arms was granted on 22 August 1986. The official blazon is "Or, a navigation cairn sable". This means the arms have a field (background) that has a tincture of Or which means it is commonly colored yellow, but if it is made out of metal, then gold is used. The charge is black navigational cairn. This was chosen to symbolize the local dependence on fishing and sailing in this island municipality. The arms were designed by Olga Nilsen after a proposal by Dagmar Vilfridadottir Olaisen.

Churches
The Church of Norway has two parishes within the municipality of Lurøy. It is part of the Nord-Helgeland prosti (deanery) in the Diocese of Sør-Hålogaland.

Geography and climate
Lurøy is located on the western coast of Helgeland. The small strip of mainland Lurøy runs from Tonnes in the north along Norwegian County Road 17 to Stokkvågen along the Sjona fjord in the south. The rest of the municipality is located on 1,375 islands located to the west of the mainland. The major islands include Aldra, Lurøya, Onøya, Stigen, Solvær, and Lovund. There are also two islands in the northern part of Lurøya that are divided between Lurøy and neighboring Rødøy Municipality: Nesøya and Hestmona.

The populated islands are reached by car ferry from Stokkvågen on the mainland. The ferry reaches Onøy (which has a bridge to Lurøya), Solvær and Lovund 5 times per day.

Climate
Norwegian Meteorological Institute has operated weather stations on Solvær islands since 1939. Data shows a marine west coast climate (oceanic climate) with very mild winters for the high latitude. Spring and summer are the driest seasons, while December is the wettest month. The all-time high was recorded in July 2018, and the all-time low is from February 1966. The average date for the last overnight freeze (low below ) in spring is 20 April and average date for first freeze in autumn is 5 November giving a frost-free season of 198 days (1981-2010 average for Solvær).

Government
All municipalities in Norway, including Lurøy, are responsible for primary education (through 10th grade), outpatient health services, senior citizen services, unemployment and other social services, zoning, economic development, and municipal roads. The municipality is governed by a municipal council of elected representatives, which in turn elect a mayor.  The municipality falls under the Rana District Court and the Hålogaland Court of Appeal.

Municipal council
The municipal council of Lurøy is made up of 19 representatives that are elected to four year terms. The party breakdown of the council is as follows:

Mayors
The mayors of Lurøy:

 1837-1840: Christian Eilert Rasch 
 1840-1845: Daniel Strøm Dundas 
 1846-1850: Carl Nicolai Bugge 
 1850-1854: Benjamin Olsen 
 1854-1860: Jeremias Willichsen 
 1860-1864: John Erik Steffensen 
 1865-1865: Paul Christian Føyn 
 1865-1866: Jens Christian Pettersen Tønder 
 1867-1869: John Erik Steffensen 
 1869-1870: Cornelius Eitran 
 1871-1875: Iver Olsen Riise 
 1875-1881: Knut Hansen 
 1881-1884: Anders Knutsen 
 1885-1886: Laurits Torgersen 
 1886-1886: Martin Israelsen 
 1887-1896: Mathias Knutsen  
 1896-1922: Isak Dundas 
 1922-1941: Jakob Victor Hansen 
 1941-1943: Fredrik Thorstein Krüger 
 1943-1945: Peder Larsen 
 1945-1947: Aubert Jentoft  
 1947-1961: Torvald Brandser
 1961-1963: Ivar Riise 
 1963-1971: Torleif Hansen 
 1971-1973: Per Rise 
 1973-1975: Egil Fjellgård  
 1975-1978: Nils Nermark 
 1979-1988: Johannes Bentzen (Sp)
 1988-2007: Steinar A. Joakimsen (Ap)
 2007-2011: Carl Einar Isachsen, Jr. (Sp)
 2011-2015: Bjørnar Skjæran (Ap)
 2015-2019: Carl Einar Isachsen, Jr. (Sp)
 2019-present: Håkon Lund (H)

Media gallery

Notable people 
 Harry Johan Olai Klippenvåg (1913 in Lurøy – 1994) a Norwegian politician, Mayor of Sør-Varanger in 1940's & 50's
 Herluf Nygaard (1916 in Lurøy – 2001) a Norwegian military officer, active resistance fighter during WWII

References

External links
Municipal fact sheet from Statistics Norway 

 
Municipalities of Nordland
1838 establishments in Norway